Elachista nolckeni is a moth of the family Elachistidae. It is found from Estonia to the Pyrenees and Italy and from France to Poland and Slovakia. It is also found in Russia.

The larvae feed on Phleum phleoides. They mine the leaves of their host plant. The mine starts a narrow gallery that ascends from the base of the leaf to nearly the tip. It then descends, forming a pale green inflated blotch. Pupation takes place under the ground. They are pale yellowish green to olive green with a yellowish brown head.

References

nolckeni
Moths described in 1992
Moths of Europe